Kwara North Senatorial District covers five local government areas which include Baruten, Edu, Pategi, Kaiama, Moro. Umar Suleiman Sadiq of the All Progressives Congress, APC is the current representative of Kwara North in the Nigerian Senate.

List of senators representing Kwara North

References 

Kwara State
Senatorial districts in Nigeria